|}

The Rehearsal Handicap Chase is a Premier Handicap National Hunt steeplechase in Great Britain which is open to horses aged four years or older. It is run at Newcastle, over a distance of about 3 miles (2 miles 7 furlongs and 91 yards or  4,727 metres). It is a handicap race, and it is scheduled to take place each year in December.

The race was first run in 1979 at Chepstow, the name indicating that runners should consider it as a "rehearsal" for the Cheltenham Gold Cup.  It was initially a Conditions race with Listed status but became a Limited handicap (still with Listed status) in 1988. It was run at Chepstow until 2004 (over the longer distance of 3 miles and 2 furlongs between 2002 and 2004) and during this period was often used as a stepping stone towards  the Welsh Grand National which is run at the same course around four weeks later. It was re-classified as a Premier Handicap in 2022 when Listed status was removed from handicap races.

Winners
 Weights given in stones and pounds.

See also
 Horse racing in Great Britain
 List of British National Hunt races

References

Racing Post: 

National Hunt races in Great Britain
National Hunt chases
Newcastle Racecourse